İlhan Cavcav (4 October 1935 – 22 January 2017) was the chairman of Turkish club Gençlerbirliği in Ankara, Turkey for almost 40 years until his death. He was known for his hard negotiation tactics with the big clubs in Turkey and scouting abilities especially for discovering talent from Africa.

Personal life
Cavcav was a Kosovo Albanian from Pristina. His father Haşim had 2 wives and 17 children. He owned a flour mill in Mamak and a small bakery shop. İlhan left school at the age of 14 in order to help support the family and started to work with his father as a cashier in the mill. In 1960, he formed his own business and in 1969 he opened his own more modern flour mill in Ankara (Ankara Un Sanayii).

Early years playing football
At 16, he started to play football with a local team Mamak Maskespor. When he was 19 he was transferred to another Ankara team PTT. Cavcav has stated that PTT expected him to play professionally and he was unable due to his work at the flour mill with his father. Still 19, he briefly joined another local team Bahçeli Gençlik Spor before ending this period. It was to be years later that he returned to football as a Chairman.

Career as Chairman
His first trial as a chairman was with the local Ankara team Hacettepe Kulübü in 1976. After Hacettepe relegated in the same season, he resigned from his position. In 1977, he served under Hasan Şengel as a board member in his current club Gençlerbirliği. In 1978's election, he became the Chairman for Gençlerbirliği when the team was in Turkish Second League. Gençlerbirliği relegated to Third League in 1979. The Turkish Football federation merged the second and third Leagues in 1980. This was an automatic promotion to second league. In 1983, Cavcav's Gençlerbirliği promoted to Turkish First League. Gençlerbirliği played in 1st League except 1988–89 season, when played in 2nd league.

In recent years, Gençlerbirliği fans have been highly critical of Cavcav stating that the club turned into a company seeking for the maximum profit and ignoring the target of success in the Turkish League and in European competitions. Fans are not happy with the situation about the instability of the squad because Cavcav never rejects the transfer offers coming from the big teams in Turkey for the best players of the team.

On the other hand, anti-democratic attitudes in the elections of  club management also are used as a means of criticizing Cavcav. Allegations were; in last club elections, nearly 1200 new members were added to the club who were not even Genclerbirligi fan. Opposition group went to court However, the Turkish court did not approve the case. 

In November 2014, Cavcav announced that he would be fining bearded players, claiming that they were a bad influence for the youth. Cavcav said that he would fine players that kept their beards 25,000 Turkish Liras and also attacked UEFA for not banning beards in all of its completions.

Death
Cavcav was taken to hospital after falling and hitting his head, which caused a brain hemorrhage. He was kept in intensive care unit. One day later, on January 22, 2017, he was pronounced dead. On January 23, he was buried at Cebeci Asri Cemetery in Ankara.

Achievements
 He is the longest serving professional football club chairman in Turkey (1978–2017).

Trivia
 Cavcav had two sons and both are serving on the current Gençlerbirliği board.
 He personally visited African nations numerous times for football talent scouting.
 Gençlerbirliği had 22 chairmen in the 54 years to 1974 and for the last 29 years just one person in the role.
 Erdal Beşikçioğlu is his nephew and is a fan of Gençlerbirliği, even showing it some of his works, especially in Behzat Ç. Bir Ankara Polisiyesi.

References

External links
 
 Fans site
 Genclerbirliği Fans and Statistics site
 Genclerbirligi Fans and Comment site

1935 births
2017 deaths
Gençlerbirliği S.K.
Sportspeople from Ankara
Turkish football chairmen and investors
20th-century Turkish businesspeople
Turkish people of Albanian descent
Burials at Cebeci Asri Cemetery
Turkish footballers